Brian Boatright (born June 16, 1962) is an American lawyer and judge, who is the chief justice of the Colorado Supreme Court. He previously served as a judge on the Colorado District Court from 1999 to 2011.

Education and early career
Boatright was born in Golden, Colorado, and graduated from Jefferson High School in Edgewater, Colorado, in 1980. He completed a Bachelor of Arts degree in 1984 at Westminster College in Fulton, Missouri, and received a Juris Doctor degree in 1988 from the Sturm College of Law of the University of Denver.

After a brief period in private practice, Boatright served from 1990 to 1999 as a deputy district attorney in Colorado's 1st judicial district. This district covers two counties, Gilpin and Jefferson, which are immediately west of Denver and part of the Denver metropolitan area.

Judicial service
In 1999, the Republican Governor of Colorado Bill Owens appointed Boatright as a state judge on the Colorado District Court for the 1st District. He was elected to new term on the court in a retention election in 2002 with 52% of the vote, and again in 2008 with 96% of the vote. Boatright oversaw more than 100 jury trials, and became known for his experience in juvenile court and family law.

In 2011, Colorado Supreme Court justice Alex J. Martinez announced that he would resign, effective from October 31, 2011. The Colorado Judicial Nominating Commission selected Boatright as one of three possible candidates to replace Martinez. The other two candidates were attorney Frederick Martinez and University of Colorado lawyer Patrick O'Rourke. Democratic Governor John Hickenlooper announced Boatright, a registered Republican, as his choice to replace Martinez on October 27, 2011.

Boatright was sworn in as a member of the Colorado Supreme Court on November 21, 2011. He was re-elected to a new ten-year term in a retention election in November 2014, where he received 57% of the vote. Boatright's current term on the court expires on January 14, 2025. When Nathan B. Coats retired on January 1, 2021, Boatright succeeded him as chief justice.

References

|-

1962 births
Living people
21st-century American judges
Chief Justices of the Colorado Supreme Court
Colorado Republicans
Colorado state court judges
Justices of the Colorado Supreme Court
People from Golden, Colorado
Sturm College of Law alumni
University of Denver alumni
Westminster College (Missouri) alumni